Karl Friedrich von Gaertner (or Carl Friedrich von Gärtner) (1 May 1772 – 1 September 1850) was a well-known German botanist, and the son of Joseph Gaertner. He was a pioneer in the study of hybrids, and he is considered an important influence on Gregor Mendel.

Gärtner, who was a protestant, challenged the doctrine of Carl Linnaeus of the "new special creation" which stated that new species of vegetation could arise through hybridization. He defended the stability of species, and argued that although the transmutation of species was evidently possible, the new species would not last because of a law of reversion which prevented them from spreading freely. As was reported in the words of Mendel:

Gärtner is mentioned 17 times in Gregor Mendel's short famous paper Experiments on Plant Hybridization and 32 times in the first edition of Charles Darwin's On the Origin of Species. He also is the most cited by nominal appearances in the sixth edition of the Origin.

References 

1772 births
1850 deaths
People from Calw
Botanists with author abbreviations
19th-century German botanists
German Christians
German Protestants
Proto-evolutionary biologists